The 2018–19 season is Chaves' 16th season in the top flight of Portuguese football.

Squad
Last updated on 19 January 2019

Transfers

In

Out

Pre-season and friendlies

Competitions

Overall record

Primeira Liga

League table

Results by round

Matches

Taça de Portugal

Third round

Fourth round

Fifth round

Taça da Liga

Second round

Third round

Player statistics
{| class="wikitable sortable" style="text-align:center"
|-
! rowspan="1" style="background:#00008B; color:white;"|
! rowspan="1" style="background:#00008B; color:white;"|
! rowspan="1" style="background:#00008B; color:white;"|Nationality
! rowspan="1" style="background:#00008B; color:white;"|Name
! colspan="2" style="width:60px; background:#00008B; color:white;"|Total
! colspan="2" style="width:60px; background:#00008B; color:white;"|Primeira Liga
! colspan="2" style="width:60px; background:#00008B; color:white;"|Taça de Portugal
! colspan="2" style="width:60px; background:#00008B; color:white;"|Taça da Liga
|-
! colspan="14" style="background:#00008B; color:white;text-align:center"| Goalkeepers     

|-
! colspan="14" style="background:#00008B; color:white;text-align:center"| Defenders 

|-
! colspan="14" style="background:#00008B; color:white;text-align:center"| Midfielders 
|-

|-
! colspan="14" style="background:#00008B; color:white;text-align:center"| Forwards 

|-
! colspan="14" style="background:#00008B; color:white;text-align:center"| Players transferred out during the season

References

G.D. Chaves seasons
Chaves